Planetarni čovek is an album by the Serbian noise-rock band Klopka Za Pionira, released in 2006 (see 2006 in music) on the Ne-ton independent label. It is one of the more seriously crafted albums by Klopka, and the first recorded on professional equipment. This album contains a cover version of Tom Waits' song "Poor Edward", translated into Serbian. The album cover was drawn by Maja Veselinović.


Track listing
All lyrics by Mileta Mijatović (except where noted) and music by Damjan Brkić (liner notes list Vladimir Lenhart as author of bass lines))
"Prstima pritisni oči" – 3:42
"1000 paranoja" – 4:52
"Siromašni Edvard" – 3:21 - Tom Waits Google translated into Serbian
"Karta sveta" – 5:18
"Da li hoćeš da ti pevam" – 1:00
"Red i mir" – 4:30 - lyrics by Momčilo Bajagić and Minja Subota
"Svet te steže" – 6:14
"Nije neka pravda" – 4:26
"Pobuna robota" – 3:46
"Vranjina" – 7:52

Personnel
Mileta Mijatović - vocals, trumpet
Damjan Brkić - guitar, drum machine
Vladimir Lenhart - bass guitar

References

External links 
 

Klopka Za Pionira albums
2006 albums